Migdal HaEmek (lit. Tower of the Valley, also officially spelt Migdal HaEmeq) is a city in the Northern District of Israel. 

There is a tower to the north-east, above the town.

History

Background and establishment

Prior to 1953, the area nearest to where Migdal HaEmek was founded was an Arab Palestinian village named al-Mujaydil. It had existed there since as early as 1596 during the Ottoman era.

In July 1948 al-Mujaydil was "completely destroyed" in July 1948  due to aerial bombing during the operations conducted by Yishuv Golani Brigade forces, when villagers fled, resulting in its depopulation.  and Migdal HaEmek was built on the razed ruins.

Migdal HaEmek was started in 1953 as a ma'abara for Jews from Arab countries, before becoming a development town. The original site of the ma'abara was west of the current site, at Shimron hill.

In 1959, during Wadi Salib riots, the "Union des Nords-africains led by David Ben Haroush, organised a large-scale procession walking towards the nice suburbs of Haifa creating little damages but a great fear within the population. This small incident was taken as an occasion to express the social malaise of the different Oriental communities in Israel and riots spread quickly to other parts of the country; mostly in towns with a high percentage of the population having North African extraction like in Tiberias, in Beer-Sheva, in Migdal HaEmek".

The chief rabbi of the city is Rabbi Yitzchak Dovid Grossman, who won the Israel Prize in 2004 for his social service work and outreach youth programs. Every year volunteers from Habonim Dror come to Migdal HaEmek to volunteer in the community.

Demographics 
According to CBS, in 2001 the ethnic makeup of the city was all Jewish and "other" non-Arabs.
There were 11,900 males and 12,200 females. More recently the Jewish Agency estimated Migdal HaEmek's population at 28,000, almost half foreign-born, from Russia, the Caucasus, Ethiopia, Morocco, Iraq and South America.

Education 
According to CBS, there were 22 schools and 5,777 students in the city in 2001: 13 elementary schools (2,995 students), and 2 high schools (2,782 students). 47.8% of 12th grade students qualified for a matriculation certificate in 2001.

Economy
Many Israeli and global high tech companies are located in three industrial parks.  Among the companies: Tower Semiconductor (foundry), RSL Electronics (Control and Diagnostic solutions for defence and commercial applications ), KLA-Tencor (inspection tools), CI Systems (electro-optical test systems, non contact temperature sensors and wet chemistry analyzers), Nilit (Nylon for textile industry and thermoplastics for industrial and commercial applications), Vishay Intertechnology (discrete and passive semiconductors components), Enzymotec (functional lipids) and Flex (Electronics contract manufacturer).

Notable people
Haim Dayan (born 1960), politician

References

External links
Official website

Development towns
1953 establishments in Israel
Cities in Northern District (Israel)
Populated places established in 1953